Andrew or Andy Kelly may refer to:

 Andrew Kelly (Australian politician) (1854–1913), New South Wales politician
 Andy Kelly (hurler) (1898–?), Irish hurler
 Andy Kelly (rugby league) (born 1960), English rugby league footballer
 Andy Kelly (American football) (born 1968), American football quarterback
 Andrew Kelly (rugby union, born 1981), Scottish rugby union player for Glasgow Warriors
 Andrew Kelly (rugby union, born 1982), Scottish rugby union player for Edinburgh Rugby
 Andrew Kelly (footballer) (born 1984), English footballer
 Andrew Kelly (bowls) (born 1989), New Zealand lawn and Indoor bowler
 Andrew Kelly (Redwater), fictional character

See also
 Andrew J. Kelley, American Civil War soldier and Medal of Honor recipient
 Andrew Kelley, designer of the programming language Zig
 Andrew Kelley (actor), actor in the 1992 Dutch film For a Lost Soldier